Nimbus Film is Denmark's third largest film production company.

Nimbus Film has to date produced more than 30 feature films and many shorts and documentaries.

Of their more known feature films are the Dogme 95 movies The Celebration (1998, directed by Thomas Vinterberg) which won the Jury Prize at the Cannes Film Festival in 1998, and Mifune's Last Song (1999, directed by Søren Kragh-Jacobsen) which won the Silver Bear at Berlin International Film Festival 1999. Recent successes include A Soap (2006, directed by Pernille Fischer Christensen) also winner of the Silver Bear at Berlin International Film Festival in 2006, and the World War II film Flame & Citron (2008, directed by Ole Christian Madsen) a huge box office hit in Denmark in 2008, and distributed worldwide. In 2010 Thomas Vinterberg's Submarino was selected to the main competition at The Berlin Film Festival.

Nimbus Film was founded in 1993 by Birgitte Hald and Bo Ehrhardt, who today own the company alongside the TF1 Group-owned Newen, who took a 33% stake in the company in 2018.

Selected productions

The Beast Within (1995) by Carsten Rudolf
The Greatest Heroes (1996) by Thomas Vinterberg
The Celebration (1998) by Thomas Vinterberg
Pizza King (1999) by Ole Christian Madsen
Mifune's Last Song (1999) by Søren Kragh-Jacobsen
Detector (2000, co-production) by Pål Jackman
Miracle (2000) by Natasha Arthy
Max (2000) by Trine Piil Christensen
Kira's Reason (2001) by Ole Christian Madsen
Catch That Girl (Klatretøsen) (2002) by Hans Fabian Wullenweber
Gemini (2003) by Hans Fabian Wullenweber
Scratch (2003) by Anders Gustafsson
Torremolinos 73 (2003, co-production) by Pablo Berger
Skagerrak (2003) by Søren Kragh-Jacobsen
Old, New, Borrowed and Blue (2003) by Natasha Arthy
It's All About Love (2003) by Thomas Vinterberg
King's Game (2004) by Nikolaj Arcel
Niceland (2004, co-production) by Fridrik Thor Fridriksson
Count to 100 (2004) by Linda Krogsøe Holmberg
Dark Horse (2005) by Dagur Kári
Angels in Fast Motion (2005) by Ole Christian Madsen
Dear Wendy (2005, co-production) by Thomas Vinterberg
Prague (2006) by Ole Christian Madsen
A Soap (2006) by Pernille Fischer Christensen
Island of Lost Souls (2007, co-production) by Nikolaj Arcel
A Man Comes Home (2007) by Thomas Vinterberg
White Night (2007) by Jannik Johansen
Cecilie (2007) by Hans Fabian Wullenweber
Fighter (2007) by Natasha Arthy
Flame & Citron (2008) by Ole Christian Madsen
What No One Knows (2008) by Søren Kragh-Jacobsen
Over Gaden Under Vandet (2009) by Charlotte Sieling
Camping (2009 film) (2009) by Jacob Bitsch
Sorte Kugler (2009) by Anders Matthesen
Flugten (2009) by Kathrine Windfeld
Eksperimentet (2010) by Louise Friedberg
Submarino (2010) by Thomas Vinterberg
Valhalla Rising (2010) by Nicolas Winding Refn
Hold om mig (2010) by Karpar Munk
Superclàsico (2011) by Ole Christian Madsen
Bora Bora (2011) by Hans Fabian Wullenweber

References

External links
 
 

Film production companies of Denmark
Mass media companies based in Copenhagen
Danish companies established in 1993
Companies based in Copenhagen Municipality